Adams v. Burke, 84 U.S. (17 Wall.) 453 (1873), was a United States Supreme Court case in which the Court first elaborated on the exhaustion doctrine. According to that doctrine, a so-called authorized sale of a patented product (one made by the patentee or a person authorized by it to sell the product) liberates the product from the patent monopoly. The product becomes the complete property of the purchaser and "passes without the monopoly." The property owner is then free to use or dispose of it as it may choose, free of any control by the patentee. Adams is a widely cited, leading case. A substantially identical doctrine applies in copyright law and is known as the "first sale doctrine".

As the Supreme Court recently explained, in Kirtsaeng v. John Wiley & Sons, Inc., 133 S. Ct. 1351 (2013), the principle comes from early English common law of property, explained in Coke on Littleton early in the 17th century. Under the common law, if a man is possessed of a chattel (item of personal property) and he transfers his property in it to another, no restriction against the use or disposition of the chattel will be effective, for that would hinder trade and commerce – it would interfere with bargaining among men. If once a patented product was sold and allowed to enter the stream of commerce, if it could be subject to restrictions (perhaps secret) on its use or further disposition, businessmen would not be able to know whether transactions in the product were effective and business certainty would be greatly impaired.

Factual background

In 1863, U.S. Patent No. 38,713 issued to the inventors Merrill and Horner for a  coffin lid that permitted interested persons to view the name-plate and inscription of the decedent in the coffin, irrespective of whether the coffin cover is open or closed. In 1865 they assigned to Lockhart & Seelye of Cambridge. Massachusetts, the ownership of the patent in a circular area around Boston having a ten-mile radius. Adams, the plaintiff in this case, was the assignee of the patent in an area outside this circle which included the town of Natick, Massachusetts.

Burke, the defendant, was an undertaker doing business in Natick, Massachusetts, seventeen miles from Boston. Burke purchased some patented coffin lids from Lockhart & Seelye, who had manufactured them. Burke then took them to Natick (more than ten miles from Boston), and used them in his business. Adams then sued him.

Trial court opinion

The circuit court for the district of Massachusetts dismissed the case. It said:

Supreme Court opinion

Adams appealed to the Supreme Court, which affirmed. The Court began by observing that this was a case of first impression in the Supreme Court although the governing principle had been involved in other patent cases. That principle was this:

Accordingly, the Court ruled that "we hold that in the class of machines or implements we have described, when they are once lawfully made and sold, there is no restriction on their use to be implied for the benefit of the patentee or his assignees or licensees."

Subsequent Supreme Court cases following the doctrine of the Adams case include:
 Motion Picture Patents Co. v. Universal Film Mfg. Co., 243 U.S. 502 (1917).
 Straus v. Victor Talking Machine Co., 243 U.S. 490 (1917).
 Ethyl Gasoline Corp. v. United States, 309 U.S. 436 (1940).
 United States v. Univis Lens Co., 316 U.S. 241 (1942).
 Aro Mfg. Co. v. Convertible Top Replacement Co., 365 U. S. 336 (1961).
 Quanta Computer, Inc. v. LG Electronics, Inc., 553 U.S. 617 (2008).

But see:
 United States v. General Electric Co., 272 U.S. 476 (1926).
 General Talking Pictures Corp. v. Western Electric Co., 304 U.S. 175 (1938).

References

External links
 

United States Supreme Court cases
United States patent case law
United States misuse law
1873 in United States case law
United States Supreme Court cases of the Chase Court